The 1985 Virginia Slims Championships were the fourteenth WTA Tour Championships, the annual tennis tournament for the best female tennis players in singles on the 1984 WTA Tour, which ran from March 1984 to March 1985. It was held in the week of 18 March 1985 and played on indoor carpet courts in Madison Square Garden in New York City, United States.

Champions

Singles

 Martina Navratilova defeated  Helena Suková, 6–3, 7–5, 6–4

Doubles

 Martina Navratilova /  Pam Shriver defeated  Claudia Kohde-Kilsch /  Helena Suková, 6–7, 6–4, 7–6

External links
 
 WTA tournament edition details
 ITF tournament edition details

WTA Tour Championships
Virginia Slims Championships
Virginia Slims Championships
Virginia Slims Championships
1980s in Manhattan
Virginia Slims Championships
Madison Square Garden
Sports competitions in New York City
Sports in Manhattan
Tennis tournaments in New York City